Where You Go I Go is the third live album by American Christian worship duo Brian & Jenn Johnson. The album was released on September 30, 2008 by ION Records. Jeremy Edwardson and Brian Johnson worked together on the production of the album. The album was recorded live at Bethel Church in Redding, California.

Critical reception

In a review for Cross Rhythms, Adrian Cherrill bestowed the album eight squares out of ten, saying "Lyrically strong and excellently played, the whole album exudes a powerful worship atmosphere." Justin K of NewReleaseToday rated the album four and a half stars out of a possible five stating that the album was "great" for "worship leaders or any body who loves new, fresh worship music."

Track listing

Personnel
Adapted from AllMusic.

 Marc Cooper – electric guitar
 Jeremy Edwardson – engineer, producer, programming
 Brian Johnson – digital editing, engineer, executive producer, acoustic guitar, electric guitar, primary artist, producer, vocals
 Jenn Johnson – piano, primary artist, background vocals, vocals
 Michael Joyce – bass, digital editing, engineer, programming
 Ian McIntosh – Fender Rhodes, keyboards, piano
 Marc Pusch – executive producer
 Chris Quilala – drums
 Kim Walker-Smith – background vocals

Release history

References

2008 live albums
Brian & Jenn Johnson albums
Live contemporary Christian music albums